Sharifa Quader is a Bangladeshi politician who is the incumbent Jatiya Sangsad member from the reserved women's seat-45.

Career 
Quader is advisor to the chairman of Jatiya Party, president of Jatiya Sanskritik Party and president of Lalmonirhat district Jatiya Party.

On 13 September 2021, Masuda M Rashid Chowdhury, a Jatiya Sangsad member from the reserved women's seat-45 of the 11th National Assembly died in office. In the by-election of this vacant seat, on 1 November, Quader was nominated without a contest.

Personal life 
Quader is married to GM Quader, the current chairman of Jatiya Party. Her daughter Ishrat Jahan Quader's husband is actor Mahfuz Ahmed.

References 

Living people
People from Lalmonirhat District
Jatiya Party (Ershad) politicians
11th Jatiya Sangsad members
Year of birth missing (living people)